Alone is an album by jazz musician Bill Evans, recorded in late-1968 for Verve Records.

Background 
Alone was recorded at Webster Hall in the East Village, which was reserved for two recording sessions in October of 1968. A Steinway & Sons concert grand piano model D-274 was chosen by Bill Evans for this recording.

Release 
Released in April 1970 
, the Grammy Award-winning Alone was Bill Evans' first single piano solo album following in the footsteps of his 1963 Verve session Conversations with Myself (three pianos overdubbed) and his 1967 Further Conversations with Myself, also on Verve (two pianos overdubbed). It has been reissued in various forms with additional tracks and alternate takes from sessions on September 23, October 8 and 21st.

Track listing
"Here's That Rainy Day" (Jimmy Van Heusen, Johnny Burke) – 5:21
"A Time for Love" (Johnny Mandel, Paul Francis Webster) – 5:06
"Midnight Mood" (Joe Zawinul, Ben Raleigh) – 5:20
"On a Clear Day (You Can See Forever)" (Burton Lane, Alan Jay Lerner) – 4:48
"Never Let Me Go" (Ray Evans, Jay Livingston) – 14:32

Additional tracks on 1988 CD reissue:
"Medley: All the Things You Are/Midnight Mood" (Jerome Kern, Oscar Hammerstein II)/(Joe Zawinul, Ben Raleigh) – 4:11
"A Time for Love" (Johnny Mandel, Paul Francis Webster) – 6:56

The 2002 CD reissue includes other alternate takes.

Personnel 
 Bill Evans – piano
Technical
Helen Keane – producer
Val Valentin – director of engineering
Roy Hall – engineer
Sid Maurer – art direction
Nancy Reiner – cover art 
Mickey Leonard – supervising consultant

References

External links
Jazz Discography Bill Evans Catalog
Bill Evans Memorial Library

1970 albums
Bill Evans albums
Instrumental albums
Verve Records albums
Grammy Award for Best Jazz Instrumental Album
Solo piano jazz albums